University reform is a type of education reform applied to higher education.

Examples include:
Argentine university reform of 1918
Chilean university reform
Reform of French universities
Law on Higher Education and Research (2007)
Liberties and Responsibilities of Universities (2013)
Norwegian university college reform
Oxford University Act 1854

See also
Bologna Process